Wahl is a Norwegian and Danish surname which roots from the German wal meaning 'field'. The name may also originate from the German word Wahl (meaning "election" or "choice") or from Yiddish, in which wahl means "from Italy". Notable people with the surname include:
 Anne Wahl (born 1953), Norwegian sprint canoer
 Arthur C. Wahl, American chemist
 Asbjørn Wahl (born 1951), Norwegian researcher and author
 Ballie Wahl (1920–1978), South African rugby player
 Bernt Wahl, American author, entrepreneur and mathematician
 Betty Wahl (1924–1988), American novelist and short story writer
 Bobby Wahl (born 1992), American baseball player
 Charlotte Wahl (1817–1899), Latvian philanthropist
 Charlotte Johnson Wahl (born 1942), British artist and mother of Boris Johnson
 Corrine Wahl (born 1954), American model and actress
 Edgar de Wahl (1867–1948), Baltic German linguist and scholar
 Eduard Wahl (1903–1985), German CDU politician
 Erik Wahl, American artist and entrepreneur
 François Wahl (1925–2014), French editor and structuralist
 Frank-Michael Wahl (born 1956), German handball player
 George Douglas Wahl (1895–1981), American military officer
 Grant Wahl (1974–2022), American sports journalist
 Harry Wahl (1869–1940), Finnish businessman, violin collector, and sailor
 Harry Wahl (1902–1975), Canadian political figure
 Hauke Wahl (born 1994), German footballer
 Henry Wahl, (1915–1984) Norwegian speed skater
 Jacques Wahl (born 1971), South African cricketer
 James M. Wahl (1846–1939), Norwegian American settler and South Dakota legislator
 Jan Boyer Wahl (born 1933), American children's book author
 Jean Wahl (1888–1974), French philosopher
 Jens Wahl (born 1966), German footballer
 Johann Salomon Wahl (1689–1765), German artist
 John Eshleman Wahl (1933–2010), American civil rights attorney
 Jonathan Wahl, American mathematician
 Karl Wahl (1892–1981), German Nazi Gauleiter of Swabia
 Ken Wahl (born 1954), American film and television actor
 Kermit Wahl (1922–1987), American baseball player
 Kurt Wahl (1912–?), German fencer
 Lutz Wahl (1869–1928), American military general
 Margit Wahl (1900 or 1903–1949), Hungarian operatic soprano singer
 Mats Wahl (born 1945), Swedish writer
 Meir Wahl, Polish rabbi
 Mitch Wahl (born 1990), American hockey player
 Moritz Callmann Wahl (1829–1887), German writer
 Nathalie Wahl (born 1976), Belgian mathematician
 Nicholas Wahl (1928–1996), American historian
 Otto Wahl (1904–1935), German cross-country skier
 Paul Wahl (1906–1982), German weightlifter
 Philippe Wahl (born 1956), French business executive
 Phoebe Wahl, American illustrator, sculptor and children's book author
 Rakel Wahl (1921–2005), Norwegian cross-country skier
 Richard Wahl (1906–1982), German fencer
 Richard L. Wahl, nuclear medicine physician
 Robert Wahl (born 1927), American football player
 Rosalie E. Wahl (1924–2013), American jurist
 Saul Wahl (1541–1617), legendary king of Poland
 Veleslav Wahl (1922–1950), Czech ornithologist and resistance activist
 Will Wahl, contestant on Survivor: Millennials vs. Gen X
 William Henry Wahl (1848–1909), American scientific editor and journalist
 Wolfgang Wahl (1925–2006), German actor

See also 
 Wahle
 Waal (disambiguation)
 Vahl

References 

German-language surnames
Jewish surnames
Yiddish-language surnames
Surnames from nicknames
Norwegian toponymic surnames